Ava Lynn Marjorie Brignol (born 1997), known professionally as Bava, is an American singer-songwriter.

Early life
Brignol graduated from Noble and Greenough School in Dedham, Massachusetts in 2014.

Career
While a BMG publishing client, Brignol co-wrote 'Taki Taki’ performed by DJ Snake ft. Selena Gomez, Ozuna, and Cardi B.

References

American singers
American singer-songwriters
1997 births
Living people